Michael Güttler is a German operatic conductor.

References

External links
Official website
Mariinsky Theatre: Michael Güttler page

Living people
German male conductors (music)
Year of birth missing (living people)
Place of birth missing (living people)
21st-century German conductors (music)
21st-century German male musicians